Ichthyodectes is an extinct genus of ichthyodectid fish which lived during the Late Cretaceous. Fossils of the species included have been found from Canada to Texas.

Description 
It lived in the Western Interior Seaway of North America during the late Cretaceous. As its species name suggests, I. ctenodon had small, uniformly sized teeth, as did its smaller relative, G. arcuatus, and may have simply sucked suitably sized prey into its mouth.

Species 

I. acanthicus
I. anaides
I. arcuatus
I. cruentus
I. ctenodon
I. elegans
I. goodeanus
I. hamatus
I. libanicus
I. minor
I. multidentatus
I. parvus
I. perniciosus
I. prognathus
I. tenuidens

References 

Ichthyodectidae
Prehistoric ray-finned fish genera
Coniacian genus first appearances
Santonian life
Campanian genus extinctions
Late Cretaceous fish of North America
Mooreville Chalk
Fossil taxa described in 1870
Taxa named by Edward Drinker Cope